Tepezalá is a municipality and town in the Mexican state of Aguascalientes. The town of Tepezalá serves as the municipal seat for the surrounding municipality of Tepezalá.

Tepezala is located on the foothills of the eastern mountains of the state, a land rich in minerals and arid in vegetation that was on the old Silver Route during the 16th century, which brought so much wealth to the region and help conquer the inhospitable north of Mexico. The town's mines made it famous and brought wealth to the state.

Demographics

As of the 2015 Mexican Intercensal Survey, Tepezalá municipality has a population of 20,926. As of 2010, the town of Tepezalá had a total population of 4,511. Other than the town of Tepezalá, the municipality had 132 localities, the largest of which (with 2010 populations in parentheses) were: San Antonio (3,345), classified as urban, and El Chayote (1,817), and Carboneras (1,261), classified as rural.

Climate

Gallery

References

External links
http://www.aguascalientes.gob.mx/estado/m_tep.html

Populated places in Aguascalientes